Falconridge is a residential neighbourhood in the northeast quadrant of Calgary, Alberta. It's bounded by Falconridge Boulevard and 44 Street E to the west, 64 Avenue N to the north, 68 Street E to the east and McKnight Boulevard to the south and is the place where Calgary Officer Andrew Harnett was slain by a 17 year old. 

The area was part of the Municipal District of Rocky View until it was annexed to the City of Calgary in 1961. Falconridge was established in 1979. It is represented in the Calgary City Council by the Ward 5 councillor.

Demographics

Residents in this community had a median household income of $48,512 in 2000, and there were 24.5% low income residents living in the neighbourhood. As of 2000, 32% of the residents were immigrants. A proportion of 6.5% of the buildings were condominiums or apartments, and 33% of the housing was used for renting.

Education
The community is served by Falconridge Elementary, Grant MacEwan Elementary, O. S. Geiger Elementary  and Terry Fox Junior High public schools, as well as by John XXIII Elementary & Junior High, Bishop McNally High School  and John Paul II Elementary School (Catholic).

See also
List of neighbourhoods in Calgary

References

External links
Falconridge-Castleridge Community Association

Neighbourhoods in Calgary